Buhigwe is an administrative ward in Kasulu District of Kigoma Region of Tanzania. 
At the time of the 2012 census, the ward had a total population of 15,224

References

Kasulu District
Wards of Kigoma Region